The Foundation for the Sorbian people (Sorbian) is a nonprofit foundation of the Federal Republic of Germany and the states of Saxony and Brandenburg. It was established to preserve of the languages, culture, and traditions.

Structure and history 
The foundation has its seat in the house of the Sorbs in Bautzen. Additionally, it has a branch offices in Cottbus and regional offices in Crostwitz, Hoyerswerda and Schleife. The foundation was established on October 19, 1991 in the Lutheran church of Lohsa by the Federal Republic of Germany and the states of Saxony and Brandenburg.

It provides most of the funding for the Sorbian institutions, granting about 23.9 million € annually to the Sorbian National Ensemble, the Domowina including its language center Witaj, the Domowina publishing house, the Serbski Institut, the German-Sorbian Theater, the Wendian Museum Cottbus and the Sorbian Museum Bautzen.

The foundation board consists of fifteen members, whereof six are representatives of the Sorbian people (four form Saxony and two from Brandenburg).

Ćišinski prize 
The foundation biennial awards the Ćišinski prize named after the Sorbian poet Jakub Bart-Ćišinski. There is a main award for extraordinary achievements and a promotion award for promising newcomers in the fields of Sorbian culture and arts. The prize contains a monetary award of 12,000€ for the main award and 4,000€ for the promotion award.

External links 

 stiftung.sorben.com – Website der Stiftung für das sorbische Volk (in German)
 Staatsvertrag zwischen dem Land Brandenburg und dem Freistaat Sachsen über die Errichtung der „Stiftung für das sorbische Volk“ vom 28. August 1998 (SächsGVBl. 1998 Nr. 23, S. 630, Fsn-Nr.: 103-1V. Fassung gültig ab: 1. Januar 1999) (in German)

References 

1991 establishments